Beth Brown may refer to:

 Beth Brown (artist) (born 1977), American artist
 Beth A. Brown (1969–2008), American astrophysicist